John Rutter Chorley (31 July 1806, Blackley Hurst, Lancashire – 29 June 1867, London) was an English author, bibliophile, and Hispanist (also interested in other Romance studies).

Born in Blackley Hurst near Billinge, Merseyside, John Rutter Chorley was the older brother of the author and critic Henry Fothergill Chorley (1808–1872). In addition to his career in railway administration as corporate secretary to the Grand Junction Railway between Liverpool and Birmingham, he worked as a private tutor. In 1845 a bequest from his uncle made him independently wealthy and he retired and moved to London. With help from George Ticknor,  (1815–1872) and experts at the British Museum, Chorley became a significant collector as a bibliophile.

Among his friends was Thomas Carlyle.

Selected works

 with Cayetano Alberto de la Barrera y Leirado: Catálogo bibliográfico y biográfico del teatro antiguo Español, desde sus origenes hasta mediados del siglo XVIII. Madrid 1860
 Catálogo de comedias y autos de Frey Lope Félix de Vega Carpio, compuesta en lengua castellana. Corregido y adicionado por Cayetano Alberto de la Barrera. In: Comedias escogidas de Frey Lope Félix de Vega Carpio, 4, 1860, S. 535–558 und Madrid 1861
 The wife’s litany. A winter-night’s dream. Ballads and other pieces in verse. London 1865

Sources
 Catalogue of the Select Library of the late John Rutter Chorley comprising works on English, French, German, Italian and Spanish Romance literature which will be sold on Wednesday, November 27, 1867
 Hugo Albert Rennert: Bibliography of the dramatic works of Lope de Vega Carpio based upon the catalogue of John Rutter Chorley. New York / Paris 1915
 John Callan James Metford: An early Liverpool Hispanist: John Rutter Chorley. In: Bulletin of Spanish Studies, 25, 100,  1948, pp. 247–259

References

External links
Named Collections of Printed Materials (C), British Library

1806 births
1867 deaths
English literary critics
English bibliophiles
British Hispanists
People from Billinge, Merseyside
19th-century English writers
19th-century British journalists
English male journalists
English male non-fiction writers
19th-century English male writers